Clifton is the southernmost suburb of New Zealand's southernmost city, Invercargill. The Clifton Wastewater Treatment Plant is situated in this area.

Demographics

Clifton had a population of 1,500 at the 2018 New Zealand census, an increase of 51 people (3.5%) since the 2013 census, and an increase of 42 people (2.9%) since the 2006 census. There were 570 households. There were 765 males and 732 females, giving a sex ratio of 1.05 males per female. The median age was 34.8 years (compared with 37.4 years nationally), with 333 people (22.2%) aged under 15 years, 318 (21.2%) aged 15 to 29, 663 (44.2%) aged 30 to 64, and 183 (12.2%) aged 65 or older.

Ethnicities were 79.4% European/Pākehā, 27.6% Māori, 5.8% Pacific peoples, 3.4% Asian, and 2.0% other ethnicities (totals add to more than 100% since people could identify with multiple ethnicities).

The proportion of people born overseas was 9.2%, compared with 27.1% nationally.

Although some people objected to giving their religion, 57.6% had no religion, 28.4% were Christian, 0.6% were Hindu, 0.4% were Buddhist and 2.8% had other religions.

Of those at least 15 years old, 75 (6.4%) people had a bachelor or higher degree, and 408 (35.0%) people had no formal qualifications. The median income was $26,400, compared with $31,800 nationally. 66 people (5.7%) earned over $70,000 compared to 17.2% nationally. The employment status of those at least 15 was that 579 (49.6%) people were employed full-time, 156 (13.4%) were part-time, and 78 (6.7%) were unemployed.

Education
Clifton School was a primary school which was established in 1872 and merged with Clarendon, Kew and Invercargill South schools to form New River Primary at the start of 2005.

References

Suburbs of Invercargill